El Asher University (EAU) is an undergraduate university located in El Asher City. Established in 2009 and was founded as a branch of Higher Technological Institute in 2009 and then became an independent University after 2011 Egyptian revolution.

Faculties
 Pharmacy
 Nursing
 Engineering

Transport
Air conditioned buses were provided by the university to and from campus.

Banking services
The Commercial International Bank (C.I.B) campus branch was situated in the registration building. The bank offered students a full range of financial services.

Educational institutions established in 2009
Universities in Egypt
2009 establishments in Egypt